Hygroplasta promyctera is a moth in the family Lecithoceridae. It was described by Chun-Sheng Wu and Kyu-Tek Park in 1998. It is found in Sri Lanka.

The wingspan is 16–18 mm. The forewings are ochreous to brown with a silky sheen. The discal spots are small and brown. The hindwings are light ochreous to light brown.

Etymology
The species name is derived from Greek promycter (meaning hooked or beak).

References

Moths described in 1998
Hygroplasta